David Martin and Rajeev Ram won this tournament, by defeating Phillip Stephens and Ashley Watling 6–2, 6–2 in the final.

Seeds

Draw

Draw

References
 Doubles Draw

USTA Challenger of Oklahoma - Doubles
USTA Challenger of Oklahoma